New Beginnings is an album by Gerald Albright. It was nominated for Best Pop Instrumental Album at the 49th Annual Grammy Awards in 2007 which became his first nomination in that category in his music career.

Track listing
 "We Got The Groove" (Gerald Albright, Jeff Lorber) - 4:07
 "New Beginnings" (Albright)- 5:10
 "Deep into My Soul" (Albright, Lorber) - 4:04
 "And the Beat Goes On" - 4:36
 "Georgia on My Mind" - 5:23
 "Take Your Time" (Albright, Lorber) - 4:35
 "I Want Somebody" (Albright, Chuckii Booker) - 4:28
 "You Are My Love" (Albright, Luther Hanes) - 5:15
 "Last But Not Least" (Albright) - 4:38
 "I Need You" (Albright, Booker) - 3:53
 "Big Shoes" (Albright, Lorber, Marion McClain) - 5:09
 "Georgia on My Mind" (reprise) - 3:52

2006 albums
Peak Records albums

Personnel 
 Gerald Albright – alto saxophone, baritone saxophone, tenor saxophone, flute, bass guitar (1, 3, 4, 6-11), drum programming (1, 2, 5, 9, 11, 12), arrangements 
 Jeff Lorber – keyboards (1, 3, 6), guitars (1, 3, 6), arrangements (1, 3, 6, 11), drum programming (3, 6)
 Tracy Carter – keyboards (2, 5, 9, 12), arrangements (2, 5, 9, 12)
 Patrice Rushen – acoustic piano solo (2)
 Rex Rideout – keyboards (4), drum programming (4), arrangements (4)
 Chuckii Booker – keyboards (7, 10), drum programming (7, 10), arrangements (7, 10), backing vocals (10)
 Luther Hanes – keyboards (8), backing vocals (8), arrangements (8)
 Paul Jackson Jr. – guitars (1, 3, 11)
 John "Jubu" Smith – guitars (2, 5, 12)
 Darrell Crooks – guitars (4)
 Rick Watford – guitars (8, 9)
 Marlon McClain – guitars (11)
 Melvin Lee Davis – bass guitar (2, 5, 12)
 Teddy Campbell – drums (1, 3, 6, 11)
 Anthony Moore – drums (2, 5, 12)
 Chris Botti – trumpet (11)
 Walter Scott – vocals (4)
 Wallace "Scotty" Scott – vocals (4)

Production 
 Andi Howard – executive producer 
 Mark Wexler – executive producer 
 Jeff Lorber – producer (1, 3, 6, 11), engineer (1, 3, 6, 11)
 Gerald Albright – engineer (1, 3, 4, 6-11), producer (2, 5, 9, 12)
 Rex Rideout – producer (4), engineer (4)
 Chuckii Booker – producer (7, 10), engineer (7, 10)
 Luther Hanes – producer (8)
 Dave Rideau – engineer (1, 3, 6, 11)
 Anthony Jeffries – engineer (2, 5, 12)
 Tracy Carter – engineer (9)
 Sonny Mediana – art direction 
 MAD Design – art direction
 Carl Studna – photography 
 Phil Collins – liner notes 
 Chapman Management – management

Studios
 Recorded at JHL Sound (Pacific Palisades, California); Castle Oaks Studio (Calabasas, California); Riverphio Studios (Anaheim, California); KAR Studios and Da Crib Studio (Sherman Oaks, California).

References